Entomoplasma is a mollicute bacteria genus. Entomoplasma freundtii (now a member of the genus Williamsoniiplasma) can be isolated from the green tiger beetle (Cicindela campestris, Coleoptera: Cicindelidae).

Phylogeny
The currently accepted taxonomy is based on the List of Prokaryotic names with Standing in Nomenclature (LPSN) and National Center for Biotechnology Information (NCBI)

Note:
♦ Paraphyletic Entomoplasma

See also 
 List of bacterial orders
 List of bacteria genera

References

External links 

 bacterio.net

Bacteria genera
Mollicutes